Christian Solidarity Worldwide (CSW) is a human rights organisation which specialises in religious freedom and works on behalf of those persecuted for their Christian beliefs, persecuted for other religious belief or persecuted for lack of belief. Its current president is Jonathan Aitken, who succeeded Baroness Cox in 2006.

CSW's team of specialist advocates work on over 20 countries across Africa, Asia, Latin America and the Middle East, to ensure that the right to freedom of religion or belief is upheld and protected.

Their vision is a world free from religious persecution, where everyone can practise a religion or belief of their choice.

Independent advocacy
CSW indicates that it is independent of any government or political persuasion, but as an advocacy organisation, CSW also aims to influence governments and other bodies on religious freedom issues in the international arena.  The CSW strives to influence attitudes and behaviours, legislation and policies that lead to religious discrimination and religious persecution.  They try to achieve lasting change in culture, politics and society.

Through its various resources, events, and initiatives, CSW also aims to mobilise the general public to pray, protest and provide on behalf of persecuted Christians, persecuted non-Christians and persecuted people with no faith.

Key Strategies
CSW's current Annual Report (2010/11) states that its purpose is to be a voice for justice, pursuing religious freedom for all. To accomplish this, they use four key strategies:
Documenting and raising awareness of religious persecution.
Influencing key decision-makers whose policies or actions affect the oppressed.
Empowering victims of human rights violations.
Offering support and solidarity to the persecuted.

See also 
Persecution of Christians
Stefanus Alliance International
Compass Direct
Forum 18
Anti-Christian sentiment
International Christian Concern, a Christian human rights NGO

References

External links 
 
 Freedom of Religion or Belief in full, CSW's official blog website

Christian advocacy groups
Persecution of Christians
International human rights organizations
Human rights organisations based in the United Kingdom
Organisations based in Surrey